The International Urdu Conference or Aalmi Urdu Conference (Urdu:عالمی اردو کانفرنس), is an international conference on Urdu language. The international conference consists of several Urdu scholars, writers and laureates from different parts of the world who contribute to the Urdu language. It is run and organized every year by the Arts Council of Pakistan.

From 2008 to present day, Arts Council of Pakistan were hosted 15th editions of International Urdu Conference. The last and 15th International Urdu Conference were held in Karachi from 1 December 2022 to 4 December 2022.

History 
International Urdu Conference started by the Arts Council of Pakistan, headquartered in Karachi in 2008, has become a yearly tradition eagerly anticipated by Pakistani writers and cultural figures. Renowned academics from India, United Kingdom, Canada, Turkey, Iran, and other countries took part and presented their research papers, theses, and creative works on Urdu language.

Editions of conference

See also 

 Urdu movement
 Arts Council of Pakistan
 Pakistan National Council of the Arts
 Ministry of Culture
 Foundation for Arts, Culture and Education
 National Academy of Performing Arts (Pakistan)
 Culture of Pakistan

References 

Urdu
Language advocacy organizations